Valeri Gennadyevich Chupin (born 18 June 1961) is a Russian professional football coach and a former player.

Career
Chupin was a product of Dynamo Barnaul's youth system and he made his debut in the Soviet Second League with the club. Chupin moved to Rotor Volgograd where he became the club's all-time record holder for number of Soviet First League appearances and after the club won promotion to the Soviet Top League in 1998, he made 20 appearances in the 1989 season.

Personal life
His son Yevgeni Chupin was also professional footballer, as is his grandson Valeri Chupin.

References

External links
 

1961 births
Living people
Soviet footballers
Soviet expatriate footballers
Russian footballers
Association football midfielders
Expatriate footballers in Finland
FC Dynamo Barnaul players
FC Rotor Volgograd players
FC Energiya Volzhsky players
Russian football managers
Soviet expatriate sportspeople in Finland